World of Sport is a British television sport programme which ran on ITV between 2 January 1965 and 28 September 1985 in competition with the BBC's Grandstand. Like Grandstand, the programme ran for several hours every Saturday afternoon.

Early years
Eamonn Andrews was the first host and the programme itself was "compiled for Independent Television" by ABC Weekend TV from its Teddington Studios, with the other ITV stations contributing footage of events in their regions. Before World of Sport, sports events had been shown across the ITV network on Saturdays as separate programmes. From the summer of 1968, after ABC lost its franchise, it was produced by London Weekend Television (LWT) under the ITV Sport banner and hosted by Dickie Davies, who would remain the face of the show until it ended in 1985. Because LWT held a weekend-only broadcast franchise, Thames Television produced bank holiday (i.e. Monday) editions, which went out as Bank Holiday Sport and later Bank Holiday Sports Special, but still presented by Davies. Other World of Sport presenters were Fred Dinenage, Steve Rider and Jim Rosenthal. 

STV and Grampian sometimes opted out and showed their own version, billed as Scotsport Special. Presented by Arthur Montford, Scotsport Special did include some live coverage from England of events which were often not shown in their entirety due to the regional sporting events taking place in Scotland. Scotsport Special was also aired on Cup Final day, when the Scottish Cup Final was taking place on the same day as the Wembley event, with the Wrestling also being moved from its pre-lunchtime slot on Cup Final days back to the expected 16:00 slot in Scotland.

The 500th edition was transmitted on 7 September 1974, while the 1000th edition was transmitted on 16 June 1984.

Features
The show included popular segments such as On the Ball (a preview of the day's football action), the ITV Seven (horse racing), and wrestling with commentator Kent Walton. It also showed sports not seen elsewhere, such as women's hockey, netball, lacrosse, water skiing and stock car racing or sports that were not popular with the British mainstream, such as NASCAR and ice speedway. It featured bizarre sports like the World Barrel Jumping Championships, and even death-defying stunts.

It often featured show jumping and other equestrian events, especially in its earlier years, and towards the end of its life it showed snooker extensively. "Minority" sports were a feature throughout its run. The BBC had purchased the rights to as many established events as it could. A joke of the period was that the BBC were going through the list of sports in alphabetical order and had run out of money before it reached wrestling which is how ITV got it.

Two sports in particular, ten-pin bowling and kart racing, benefited from television exposure to a British public hitherto unaware of them. Whilst the majority of ten-pin bowling shown from 1965 onwards focused on regional league competitions in the UK, a surge in popularity in the sport in the UK in the mid-1970s led to footage from the biennial WTBA World Championship, and telecasts from the US Professional Bowlers Tour, being included increasingly in later years (Mark Roth becoming the first bowler to convert a 7 - 10 split on television on 5 January 1980 at the ARC Alameda Open in Alameda, California, was possibly the best-remembered of the US telecasts shown on the programme). British stock car drivers such as Barry Lee also greatly benefited from the show's exposure.

The programme also occasionally acquired the rights to major sporting events, such as the Tour de France and the Ryder Cup.

During the football season, the programme would normally finish with the Results Service, which began when the day's football matches started to finish. Bob Colston read the classified results and he and John Tyrrel, who read the horse racing results, were the only regular results announcers throughout the duration of World of Sport (although between 1983 and 1985 Elton Welsby began alternating with Colston).

A typical edition would be broadcast between 12:15 and 17:10 and would take on the following format.

12:20 On The Ball - football preview with Brian Moore and in later years Ian St. John and Jimmy Greaves.
13:00 Sports Special 1 - A wide array of sports, often including clips from US show Wide World of Sports. Less prominent sports such as darts, snooker, bowls, water skiing, speedway, rallying and others would also feature. Sometimes Boxing would also be shown in this slot.
13:15 ITN News
13:20 ITV Racing.
15:00 Sports Special 2 - see Sports Special 1.
15:45 Half-Time Scores - the half-time scores from that day's football, plus racing results from races that had taken place in the previous hour.
16:00 Wrestling - a mainstay of the World of Sport schedule from 1965 until it ended. Many of the wrestlers featured became household names in the UK and the greatest rivalry was between Big Daddy and Giant Haystacks
16:45 Results Service - all the full-time football scores, match reports and league tables plus the last of the day's horse racing results.

The FA Cup Final also featured on World of Sport, with the BBC and ITV often competing for viewers by broadcasting unusual features with early starts to their broadcasts to entice viewers to watch their coverage. The Cup Final was generally the only football match that was shown live on World of Sport. The only other football match that would be shown live on World of Sport would be the England v Scotland match in the Home International Championship which from 1971 to 1982 was shared with the BBC and the 1984 match which was the final match in the last ever Home International Championship was live only on ITV as part of World of Sport and Schoolboy England Internationals from Wembley were shown on an exclusive basis and whenever ITV showed a World Cup or a European Championship finals tournament match live and the kick off time fell within World of Sports timeslot the programme would be extended. Examples of this was West Germany v England in the Quarter Final second leg of UEFA Euro 1972, Bulgaria v Sweden, Poland v Argentina, Scotland v Yugoslavia, and the third place play off in the 1974 FIFA World Cup, and Poland v Cameroon in the 1982 FIFA World Cup.

From the programme's launch until the lifting of restrictions on broadcasting hours in 1972, sports coverage was one of the few programming areas which was exempt from the restrictions. Originally sporting coverage and outside broadcasts were provided with a separate quota of broadcasting hours per year. By the start of World of Sport this amounted to 350 hours per year. This meant World of Sport was a key part of ITV's Saturday schedules, as the time the programme was on the air did not count to the overall 50 hours a week restriction on normal broadcasting hours.

Demise
After a 20-year run, the programme ended on 28 September 1985 because of a change in emphasis at ITV Sport; racing coverage had switched to Channel 4, wrestling as a programme continued but it was transmitted at 12:30 rather than teatime, which proved terminal for the programme which had a primarily working-class audience. Greg Dyke, who was in charge of the scheduling, felt that sports such as wrestling and darts were "too working class". Football coverage also continued with previous On the Ball hosts Ian St. John and Jimmy Greaves and a results service also aired during the football season.

Theme tune and opening
World of Sport had a theme tune and opening credits which featured the ITV Sport logo and the programme name as trailing banners from white Piper Super Cub light aircraft. Before this there was another intro with a clay pigeon shooter which shot a clay pigeon with the then ITV Sport S logo which when hit would zoom in ITV Presents The long running theme "World of Sport March", used between 1968 and 1983, was composed by Don Harper; a re-recorded version of the tune was introduced in the early 1980s accompanied by a new title sequence opening with a view of the Earth eclipsing the sun.

The advent of computer-generated imagery saw a new opening title sequence appear in 1983 together with a more contemporary theme tune composed by Jeff Wayne, this lasted until the series ended in 1985.

Wayne also composed a new theme tune for the opening and closing credits to the Results Service during its period as a standalone programme between 1985 and 1992. Previously a simple, ten-second musical and visual sting had been used to introduce the Results Service during the World of Sport programme itself.

Incidents

On 11 May 1985, World of Sport switched its coverage to Valley Parade stadium as match commentator John Helm, who had been covering the game for Yorkshire Television, described the events of the Bradford City stadium fire as it unfolded.
The comedian Eric Morecambe appeared as a guest on the Christmas Eve edition of World of Sport in 1977 causing mayhem by entertaining and trying to disrupt his friend Dickie Davies' presentation links.
The show featured rows of typists sitting behind the main presenter, mainly preparing items for the show. This was parodied by French and Saunders in the sketch Sports Report and featured their recurring "Extras" characters attempting to get their faces on television.

Legacy
A spin-off programme Saint and Greavsie, featuring Ian St. John and Jimmy Greaves, featuring football news, action and live chat was introduced by ITV on Saturday lunchtimes from 1985 to replace the On The Ball segment of World of Sport, enjoying a successful run that ended in 1992 when Sky Sports gained exclusive rights to broadcast English top-flight football.

From 1985, Wrestling with Kent Walton would follow immediately after Saint and Greavsie, before being dropped in December 1988 just before the popularity of the US World Wrestling Federation promotion (now World Wrestling Entertainment) gaining momentum in the UK via coverage on Sky Television from early 1989. During this period, matches from Joint Promotions, who previously held exclusive rights to ITV coverage, were supplemented with matches from rival promotion All Star Wrestling. It was originally planned to bring US wrestling to viewers on average of once a month in this slot - three weeks of the UK version and one of the American version - but the US version only appeared on a total of six occasions in the two years that it played in that slot. Between 1992 and 1995, several ITV regions screened rival US promotion World Championship Wrestling's programme WCW Worldwide in the old Saturday afternoon slot, having previously transmitted the promotion as late-night viewing. In the mid 2000s, The Wrestling Channel, later The Fight Network, purchased the broadcasting rights to World of Sports wrestling shows until the channel stopped transmitting. It was then shown on UK satellite channel Men and Movies.

The Results Service also continued as a standalone programme in its own right, presented generally by Elton Welsby, but was dropped in May 1992. The football results continued to feature on ITV for the next few seasons as part of the Saturday ITN Early Evening News bulletin. David Bobin or Graham Miller presented and did so until both presenters defected to Sky Sports at the end of the 1995/96 season.

Live coverage of sports such as athletics, darts, ice skating and snooker continued to play a part in the Saturday afternoon schedule on ITV for a time, with a single event being shown for two hours. However, this gradually diminished after a few years and eventually disappeared from the schedules.

ITV paid tribute to World of Sport as part of its 50th anniversary celebrations in September 2005. Various tie-in publications including World of Sport Annuals and a companion book were published throughout its run.

Revival of wrestling

On 17 October 2016, ITV announced that they would be bringing back professional wrestling, arguably World of Sport most popular segment. They announced they would be recording a pilot episode on 1 November 2016, being filmed at MediaCityUK in Salford. The show featured independent wrestlers such as El Ligero, Grado, and Sha Samuels. ITV also announced that former WWE commentator Jim Ross would call the pilot episode. It aired on New Year's Eve on ITV, where Grado won the World of Sport Championship. The following year on 23 March, Impact Wrestling (formerly known as TNA/Total Nonstop Action Wrestling) announced that they would be teaming with ITV to yet again bring back the show with Jeff Jarrett as an executive producer as a ten-episode series. The show was announced to be taping at Preston Guild Hall on 25 May, and 26 May. TNA talents such as Grado and Magnus (in his debut for the series) along with independent wrestlers such as El Ligero, Sha Samuels returning to the series, were confirmed to be part of the series cast. On 4 May 2017 ITV and Impact Wrestling announced that the tapings scheduled for 25 and 26 May at Preston Guild Hall had been postponed indefinitely due to prolonged contract negotiations.

In April 2018 ITV announced World of Sport Wrestling would air a ten-part series later in the year on Saturday afternoons. The shows were taped in Norwich from 10–12 May. Jim Ross was not involved, and neither was Impact Wrestling. World of Sport Wrestling aired from 28 July 2018 at 17:00 on ITV until 29 September 2018. A six-date live tour of the show took place during January/February 2019.

See also

Professional wrestling in the United Kingdom
List of professional wrestling television series

References

External links
 Archive episodes of World of Sport BFI Database
 World Sport Portal
 http://www.britishwrestlersreunion.com/

1965 British television series debuts
1985 British television series endings
1960s British sports television series
1970s British sports television series
1980s British sports television series
Television shows produced by ABC Weekend TV
Television series by ITV Studios
Black-and-white British television shows
English-language television shows
Television shows produced by Thames Television
London Weekend Television shows
Professional wrestling television series
Television shows shot at Teddington Studios